The Prussian State Council was the upper chamber of the bicameral legislature of the Free State of Prussia between 1920 and 1933. The lower chamber was the Prussian Landtag (Preußischer Landtag).

Implementation
With the adoption of the Prussian Constitution on 30 November 1920, the State Council was established according to Article 31, as an organ of the provinces: Berlin, Brandenburg, East Prussia, Hanover, Hesse-Nassau, Hohenzollern, Lower Silesia, Pomerania, Posen-West Prussia, Rhine Province, Saxony, Schleswig-Holstein, Upper Silesia, and Westphalia. The Prussian free state was a federal state of the Weimar Republic, and was thus itself represented in the Reichsrat.

Though Prussia was a unitary state, the provinces were able to participate in the legislative process. The Prussian state government (Staatsministerium) was obliged to inform the State Council about state business. The assembly could demand consultation and had the right to demand the introduction of bills by the state government. The State Council also held a limited power of veto against Landtag resolutions, overridden only by another two-thirds vote in the Landtag. 

As the upper chamber of the Prussian Landtag, the State Council was located in the former Prussian House of Lords building on Leipziger Straße in Berlin. The delegates were elected by the provincial diets, every province represented by at least three deputies (except for Hohenzollern). From 1921 to 1933 the Cologne mayor Konrad Adenauer (Centre) served as President of the State Council.

Disempowerment
Already in 1932 the State Council lost its power by the Preußenschlag of July 20, when Reich President Paul von Hindenburg by emergency decree ceded executive powers to the German Reich government under Chancellor Franz von Papen ruling by Reichskommissar deputies. In 1933 the State Council, along with all other political and state institutions in Prussia were abolished with the Machtergreifung of the Nazi Party, taking direct control in the succeeding process of Gleichschaltung (coordination). Though Landtag President Hanns Kerrl (Nazi Party) at first could not enforce its dissolution, he and Papen as Reichskommissar irrespective of Adenauer's vote declared the State Council dissolved.

Upon the federal election of 5 March 1933, the State Council under its new president Robert Ley was re-established as an assembly of confidants of Minister President Hermann Göring, among them several Nazi officials and war criminals, who received the honorific title of a Prussian Staatsrat.

See also
 List of presidents of the State Council of Prussia

Literature
 Joachim Lilla: The Prussian State Council. A Biographical Guide, series history of parliamentarism and manuals for the political parties, Volume 13, Droste Verlag, Düsseldorf, 2005.

Buildings and structures in Berlin
Defunct upper houses
Legislative buildings in Europe
1920 establishments in Germany
1933 disestablishments in Germany
Politics of Free State of Prussia